DKB (pronounced "Darkbe") is a South Korean nine-member boy band under Brave Entertainment. The group made their debut on February 3, 2020, with the release of their extended play Youth, and its lead single "Sorry Mama".

History

DKB is the first boyband to debut under Brave Entertainment since the debut of Big Star seven years prior. Their name, DKB, is short for "Dark Brown Eyes", meaning that "those who have it will reach out to the world." A representative of Brave Entertainment described the group as "a newcomer who will bring a new breeze to the music industry in 2020." Various teasers were released throughout the second half of 2019 revealing the members of the group. 

On January 16, 2020, Brave Entertainment released a teaser image showing nine figures standing against a dark background with red lighting. The image also revealed the title of the EP, Youth, along with its release date, February 3. Youth was released along with its lead single, "Sorry Mama", which was produced by Brave Brothers. The group's debut showcase was held at the Spigen Hall in Gangnam the same day. The EP entered the Gaon Album Chart at number 41 the following week.

DKB released their second EP Love, and its lead single "Still" on May 25, 2020.

On August 13, 2020, at the 2020 Soribada Awards, DKB won the "Next Artist Award", their first award since debut.

DKB released their third EP Growth and its lead single "Work Hard" on October 26, 2020.

On March 30, 2021, DKB released their first studio album The Dice Is Cast and its lead single "All In".

On October 28, 2021, DKB released their first single album Rollercoaster and its lead single of the same name.

On April 28, 2022, DKB released their fourth EP Rebel and its lead single "Sober".

On August 25, 2022, DKB released their fifth EP Autumn and its lead single "24/7".

Members
List of members and their positions, adapted from Brave Entertainment.
E-Chan – rap, dance
Teo – vocals
D1 – dance, vocal
GK – rap
Heechan – dance
Lune – vocals
Junseo – dance
Yuku – dance, vocals
Harry-June – dance

Discography

Studio albums

Extended plays

Single albums

Singles

As lead artist

Compilation appearances

Awards and nominations

Notes

References

External links
 DKB at Brave Entertainment

2020 establishments in South Korea
K-pop music groups
Musical groups established in 2020
Musical groups from Seoul
South Korean boy bands
Brave Entertainment artists
Peak Time contestants